Tatiana Viktorovna Shevtsova (born 22 July 1969) is a Russian Deputy Minister of Defence and Order of Honour recipient.

Early life and education
Shevtsova was born in 1969 in Kozelsk, USSR. She attended and later graduated from Leningrad Institute of Finance and Economics in 1991.

Career
From 1991 she worked as a tax collector for the Federal Tax Service of the Russian Federation. Since 4 August 2010 works as Deputy Minister of Defence of the Russian Federation, with responsibility for MOD finances, under a Presidential Decree. Journal Forbes included her to the list of the top richest siloviki of Russia (13th place in 2013)

Sanctions
Sanctioned by New Zealand in relation to the 2022 Russian invasion of Ukraine.

References

External links

1969 births
Living people
1st class Active State Councillors of the Russian Federation
Recipients of the Order of Honour (Russia)
Russian military personnel
Tax collectors
Saint Petersburg University of Economics and Finance alumni
Deputy Defence Ministers of Russia